René Gade Mikkelsen (born 31 January 1982 in Silkeborg) is a Danish politician, who was a member of the Folketing for The Alternative from 2015 to 2019.

Political career
Gade was first elected into parliament at the 2015 Danish general election, where he received 1,112	votes. He did not run again in 2019. He attempted to found his own party, with the intention of removing the title of Prime Minister and instead let someone from outside politics take over the role as leader. He was unsuccessful in establishing the party, with the project lasting for eight months.

References

External links 
 Biography on the website of the Danish Parliament (Folketinget)

Living people
1982 births
People from Silkeborg
The Alternative (Denmark) politicians
Leaders of political parties in Denmark
Members of the Folketing 2015–2019
20th-century Danish people